Waters Whipple Braman (April 20, 1840 Troy, Rensselaer County, New York – December 8, 1893 Trois-Rivières, Quebec, Canada) was an American politician from New York.

Life
He was the son of Horace Braman and Caroline (Whipple) Braman (1805–1845). Braman's mother died when he was young, and he went to live with his uncle, Waters W. Whipple, who also lived in Troy. He attended the common schools and Troy High School. Then he engaged in the lumber trade. In 1860, he became a partner in the firm Belknap & Braman.

When the American Civil War broke out, he closed out his business interests and joined the Army. He fought from 1861 to 1865 with the 93rd New York Volunteers in the Army of the Potomac, finishing the war as a brevet major. Braman returned to West Troy (Watervliet) and resumed his career in the lumber business, joining the firm founded by his uncle, W.W. Whipple & Company. On October 26, 1865, he married Margaret ("Maggie") Jane Getty (born 1845), and they had several children. He was a trustee of the Village of West Troy in 1873 and 1874.

He was a member of the New York State Assembly (Albany Co., 4th D.) in 1874 and 1875. In 1877, he contested the election of Democrat Edward Curran, and was seated in the 100th New York State Legislature on February 27. He was again a member of the State Assembly in 1879; and a member of the New York State Senate (17th D.) in 1880 and 1881.

In the spring of 1891, he removed with his family to Trois-Rivières in Quebec, and engaged in the lumber trade there. He died there two years later, on December 8, 1893.

Sources
 Civil List and Constitutional History of the Colony and State of New York compiled by Edgar Albert Werner (1884; pg. 291, 374f and 378)
 Life Sketches of Government Officers and Members of the Legislature of the State of New York in 1875 by W. H. McElroy and Alex. McBride (pg. 144ff)
 Braman genealogy at Gen Web
 ''History of the City of Watervliet, N.Y., 1630 to 1910 (pg. 82)

Notes 

1840 births
1893 deaths
Republican Party New York (state) state senators
Politicians from Troy, New York
Union Army officers
Republican Party members of the New York State Assembly
People from Watervliet, New York
19th-century American politicians